Štadión pod Čebraťom is a multi-purpose stadium in Ružomberok, Slovakia.  It is currently used mostly for football matches and is the home ground of MFK Ružomberok. It is named after the hill Čebrať, adjacent to which it is located, and the name of the stadium literally means "Stadium under the Čebrať Hill." The stadium holds 4,876 people. The intensity of the floodlighting is 1,400 lux.

History
The stadium was built in 1955 and used for football matches of MFK Ružomberok sport club. The original capacity was more than 20,000 (mostly for standing) spectators. In 1998 old stands were demolished and  new west stand for 2536 spectators was built . Capacity decreased. In 2006, new east stand for 2,340 spectators was built. Current capacity is 4,876 spectators (all seating).

Photo gallery

External links
Stadium Database Article
Football stadiums profile

References

Citations

General references

Stadium
Football venues in Slovakia
Multi-purpose stadiums in Slovakia
Buildings and structures in Žilina Region
Sports venues completed in 1955
1955 establishments in Czechoslovakia
Ružomberok
Sport in Žilina Region